Verbandsgemeinde Nieder-Olm is a collective municipality (Verbandsgemeinde) in the district Mainz-Bingen in Rhineland-Palatinate, Germany. The administrative center of the Verbandsgemeinde Nieder-Olm is located in the town of Nieder-Olm. The collective municipality consists of the town of Nieder-Olm and seven independent local municipalities.

The following municipalities form the Verbandsgemeinde Nieder-Olm:

 Essenheim 
 Jugenheim in Rheinhessen 
 Klein-Winternheim 
 Nieder-Olm, town
 Ober-Olm 
 Sörgenloch 
 Stadecken-Elsheim 
 Zornheim

Verbandsgemeinde in Rhineland-Palatinate